Roll Over Beethoven is a British television sitcom produced by Central Independent Television and transmitted on the ITV network in 1985.

Written by the duo Laurence Marks and Maurice Gran, the series starred Nigel Planer as millionaire pop star Nigel Cochrane, who turns life in a sleepy Surrey village upside down when he purchases the manor house, installing a recording studio in his new home and planning to record his first solo album there. 
He enlists the help of local piano teacher Belinda Purcell (Liza Goddard) to help him master the keyboard. An unlikely friendship – then romance – develops between the two as they collaborate on the album, much to the disapproval of Belinda's father, retired schoolmaster Oliver (Richard Vernon). As the series progresses, Nigel briefly leaves to go on a promotional tour of the album, while Belinda develops her talent for composing by working on an album of her own.

ITV screened all thirteen episodes in one go with a week's break in April 1985, but Roll Over Beethoven was in fact recorded in two separate production blocks. The first six episodes were directed by Derrick Goodwin, whilst Nic Phillips took over for episodes 7–13.

In The Confessional with Stephen Mangan broadcast on BBC Radio 4, Nigel Planer revealed that he chose to go on tour rather than doing a second series of Roll Over Beethoven, bringing an abrupt end to the program.

Cast

Liza Goddard – Belinda Purcell
Nigel Planer – Nigel Cochrane (eps. 1–8 & 12)
Richard Vernon – Oliver Purcell
Desmond McNamara – Lem
Emlyn Price – Marvin Sertleman (eps. 9–13)

References

External links
 
 

1980s British sitcoms
1985 British television series debuts
1985 British television series endings
English-language television shows
ITV sitcoms
Television shows produced by Central Independent Television
Television series by ITV Studios
Television shows set in Surrey